Swann Estates is a neighborhood within the city limits of Tampa, Florida. As of the 2000 census the neighborhood had a population of 1,491. The ZIP Codes serving the neighborhood are 33609 and 33629.

Geography
Swann Estates boundaries are John F. Kennedy Boulevard to the north, 
Dale Mabry Highway to the east, Morrison Avenue to the south, and 
Lois Avenue to the West

Demographics
Source: Hillsborough County Atlas

As of the census of 2000, there were 1,491 people and 725 households residing in the neighborhood. The population density was 3,907.25/mi2. The racial makeup of the neighborhood was 86% White, 4% African American, 1% Native American, 1% Asian, 6% from other races, and 1% from two or more races. Hispanic or Latino of any race were 13% of the population.

There were 725 households, out of which 23% had children under the age of 18 living with them, 40% were married couples living together, 8% had a female householder with no husband present, and 10% were non-families. 37% of all households were made up of individuals.

In the neighborhood the population was spread out, with 19% under the age of 18, 20% from 18 to 34, 32% from 35 to 49, 14% from 50 to 64, and 16% who were 65 years of age or older. For every 100 females, there were 98.1 males.

The per capita income for the neighborhood was $30,647. About 7% of the population were below the poverty line.

See also
Neighborhoods in Tampa, Florida

References

External links

Neighborhoods in Tampa, Florida